Egbert van der Poel (9 March 1621, in Delft – 19 July 1664, in Rotterdam) was a Dutch Golden Age genre and landscape painter, son of a Delft goldsmith.

Life
Van der Poel may have been a student of Esaias van de Velde and of Aert van der Neer. According to the RKD he was the brother of the painter Adriaen Lievensz van der Poel and a student of Cornelis Saftleven in Rotterdam. Van der Poel was registered with the Guild of St Luke in Delft on October 17, 1650, where he is listed as a landscape painter. In 1651 van der Poel married Aeltgen Willems van Linschooten in Maassluis, near Rotterdam. His most famous paintings depict the Delft gunpowder explosion of October 12, 1654, and its aftermath; he and his wife were living in the area at the time. Egbert and Aeltgen van der Poel had a son and three daughters. He died in Rotterdam in 1664.

References

External links
Works and literature on Egbert van der Poel
Vermeer and The Delft School, a full text exhibition catalog from the Metropolitan Museum of Art, which contains material on van der Poel

Dutch Golden Age painters
Dutch male painters
1621 births
1664 deaths
Artists from Delft
Painters from Delft